Eucnephalia is a genus of flies in the family Tachinidae.

Species
E. gonoides Townsend, 1892

References

Diptera of North America
Exoristinae
Tachinidae genera
Taxa named by Charles Henry Tyler Townsend